En Rasavin Manasile is a 1991 Indian Tamil-language romantic drama film directed by Kasthuri Raja in his directorial debut. The film stars Rajkiran (who also produced) and Meena. It was released on 13 April 1991. The film had a silver jubilee run and gave a break to Rajkiran and Meena. Vadivelu made his official acting debut with this film. The film was later remade in Telugu as Moratodu Naa Mogudu (1992) with Meena reprising her role, and in Sinhala as Ayadimi Sama (1999).

Plot 

Mayandi was a brave and strong man who was respected by the villagers. He was in love with his cousin Solaiyamma and wanted to marry her, but they had nothing in common. The soft-spoken Solaiyamma was afraid of him. In the meantime, Murugesan, a city youngster, fell in love with Solaiyamma's younger sister Kasthuri. Later, Mayandi and Solaiyamma had an arranged marriage, but Solaiyamma was still afraid of him after the marriage. One night, Mayandi came drunk in his house, molested the innocent Solaiyamma, and brutally raped her. Since that night, Solaiyamma began to avoid Mayandi, and she did not talk to him any more. A few months later, Solaiyamma discovered that she was pregnant. Mayandi and Solaiyamma were unable to understand their feelings. Finally, Ponnuthayi, Mayandi's adopted mother, brought them back together. Unfortunately, Solaiyamma died after giving birth. Kasthuri then brings up Mayandi's baby. Mayandi, who cannot take care of the baby alone, needs a wife to bring up his baby, and he thinks that Kasthuri would be the perfect mother for his baby. Kasthuri's mother however refuses as she feels Mayandi was responsible for Solaiyamma's death. Meanwhile, Murugesan compels his father Pannaiyar, a ruthless landlord, to accept for the marriage. Pannaiyar encourages Mayandi to bring back his son Murugesan, but Kasthuri stops it and clearly tells him that she can only be with Murugesan. Mayandi decides to arrange Murugesan and Kasthuri's marriage against Pannaiyar's wish. In the end, Mayandi manages to get Murugesan and Kasthuri together along with subduing Pannaiyar, but dies from his injuries.

Cast 

Rajkiran as Mayandi
Meena as Solaiyamma
Raj Chander as Murugesan
Saradha Preetha as Kasthuri
Srividya as Ponnuthayi
Nambirajan as Pannaiyar
Goundamani
Senthil
Vadivelu as Vadivelu
Dubbing Janaki as Seeniamma
K. S. Jayalakshmi as Pannaiyar's wife
Manohar as Mokkasami
Rambo Rajkumar
Babitha as Pangajam
Samikkannu as Thangamuthu

Production 
Kasthuri Raja, who earlier assisted K. S. Gopalakrishnan and Visu, made his directorial debut with this film. He said, "I went to narrate a story to Rajkiran, who was then looking for a script for Ramarajan, as he had got the dates of the popular actor. But script did not suit and I had to do a different script and Rajkiran acted in it." The film was based on a real event that happened in Kasthuri Raja's native village Malingapuram, he decided to make a film on it. The lead role was originally offered to Vijayakanth and Sathyaraj, both of whom declined.

Awards 
The film has won the following awards since its release :

Tamil Nadu State Film Awards 1991

Best Film Award (2nd Place) – Rajkiran
Special Prize for Best Actor – Rajkiran
Best Lyricist – Piraisoodan

Cinema Express Awards 1991

Best New Face Award Actor — Rajkiran

Soundtrack 
The soundtrack was composed by Ilaiyaraaja, with lyrics written by him, Ponnadiyan, Usha and Piraisoodan. The song "Poda Poda Punnakku" was recreated by Yuvan Shankar Raja for Coffee with Kadhal (2022).

References

External links 
 

1990s Tamil-language films
1991 directorial debut films
1991 films
1991 romantic drama films
Films directed by Kasthuri Raja
Films scored by Ilaiyaraaja
Indian romantic drama films
Tamil films remade in other languages